The Wellbach is a  stream in the Palatine Forest in Germany. It rises near Eschkopf and flows towards the south. In doing so, it passes the eastern edge of Hofstätten (Pfalz) in the municipality of Wilgartswiesen. It then flows under the B 10 federal highway before discharging into the Queich, as its largest tributary.

The B 48 follows the stream for its entire length.

In its upper reaches, the Wellbach forms a municipal boundary, in places, of the town of Landau, which owns extensive areas of woodland in the Palatine Forest.

See also
List of rivers of Rhineland-Palatinate

References

Rivers of Rhineland-Palatinate
Rivers and lakes of the Palatinate Forest
Südwestpfalz
Rivers of Germany